Han Engelsman (26 October 1919 – 8 February 1990) was a Dutch footballer. He played in one match for the Netherlands national football team in 1948.

References

External links
 

1919 births
1990 deaths
Dutch footballers
Netherlands international footballers
Footballers from Amsterdam
Association football midfielders
Quick 1888 players